Petrozavodsk State Glazunov Conservatoire is a public music conservatory in Petrozavodsk, the Republic of Karelia, Russia.

The Petrozavodsk Conservatoire has around 100 faculty members and provides undergraduate and postgraduate training in music to its 600 students.

The Petrozavodsk Conservatoire has two associated orchestras and a choir: Petrozavodsk Conservatoire Symphony Orchestra, Petrozavodsk Conservatoire Folk Instruments Orchestra and Petrozavodsk Conservatoire Academic Choir

History 
The Petrozavodsk Conservatoire was founded in 1967 as a branch of the Saint-Petersburg Conservatory and became an independent higher education institution in 1991.  

In 2013 it was named after the Russian composer Alexander Glazunov, former director of Saint-Petersburg Conservatory.

Directors and rectors 
 Georgi Lapchinski (1967—1971)
 Vladimir Kasatkin (1971—1976)
 Vyachheslav Kalaberda (1977—1997)
 Sergei Sukhov (1997—2002)
 Vladimir Soloviev (2002—2018)
 Aleksei Kubyshkin (since 2018)

International music competitions 
 International Chopin Piano Competition for Young Pianists
 International "Silver Sounds" Contest for Woodwinds, Brass and Percussion
 International Folk Instruments Performers Competition "The Cup of the North" named after Albin Repnikov
 International Alexander Glazunov Youth Music Competition

Departments 
 Piano Solo
 Chamber Ensemble and Piano Accompaniment
 Strings
 Woodwind, Brass and Percussion instruments
Folk Instruments 
 Vocal Arts
 Conducting 
 Music Theory and Composition
 Music History
Finno-Ugric Music

Alumni 

 Alexander Lubyantsev, International Tchaikovsky Competition prize winner
 Yulia Matochkina, International Tchaikovsky Competition prize winner
 Nadezhda Pavlova
 Arina Vaganova
 Larisa Gabitova
Yuri Klaz
Mikhail Totsky
Valentin Bogdanov

References

External links 
 http://glazunovcons.ru/

Music schools
Buildings and structures in Petrozavodsk
1967 establishments in Russia